Roller sports have been contested at the Pan American Games since the 1979 edition.

Events

All-time medal table

Artistic roller skating

Roller speed skating

Roller hockey

Combined total

Medalists

References

 
Sports at the Pan American Games
Pan American Games